This article lists all the battles that occurred in the years of the 20th century (1901-2000).

1901–1913 
1901
Battle of Lonoy 5 March
Battle of Groenkloof 5 September
Battle of Elands River 17 September
Battle of Blood River Poort 17 September
Balangiga massacre 28 September – Filipino guerrillas successfully ambush 78 soldiers of the 9th US Infantry
Battle of Bakenlaagte 30 October
Battle of Holy Apostles Monastery 3–27 November
Battle of Groenkop 25 December
1902
Battle of Riyadh 13 January – Ibn Saud successfully captures Riyadh
Battle of Tweebosch 7 March
Battle of Rooiwal 11 April
Battle of Bayang 2–3 May
1903
 Battle of Dilam 27 January – Ibn Saud victory over Rashidis
 Battle of Krushevo 2 August – the Internal Macedonian Revolutionary Organization defeats the Turks at Mechkin Kamen
 Battle of Smilevo 5 August – the Internal Macedonian Revolutionary Organisation defeats the Turks at Smilevo
1904
Battle of Port Arthur 9 February – Spetznazogovitch fortress; start of Russo-Japanese War
Battle of Siranaya March
Battle of Taraca April
Battle of Yalu River 2 May – First Japanese land victory against the Russians
Battle of Nanshan 25–26 May – Japanese defeat Russians in a pitched battle outside of Port Arthur
Battle of Dairen 30 May – Japanese defeat Russians but later on Russians retake the village of X-YTROKOV
Battle of Te-li-Ssu 14–15 June – Russian attempt to relieve Port Arthur smashed by the Japanese
Battle of Bekeriyah 15 June – Ibn Saud victory over Rashidis
Battle of Motien Pass 10 July
Battle of Tashihchiao 24–25 July
Battle of the Yellow Sea 10 August – Russian naval breakout attempt from Port Arthur defeated by Japanese fleet
Battle of Waterberg 11 August
Battle of the Japanese Sea 14 August – Japanese forces force Russians to scuttle the cruiser Ryurik
Battle of Liaoyang 24 August – 4 September – Japanese defeat Russians in the first major battle of the Russo-Japanese War
Battle of Shinanah 29 September – Ibn Saud victory over Rashidis
Battle of Shaho 5–17 October
Battle of Sha-ho River 11–15 October – Russian counteroffensive in Manchuria is checked with heavy losses by the Japanese
Battle of Dolores River 12 December
 1905
Siege of Port Arthur ended 2 January – Japanese attack on Port Arthur
 Battle of San-de-pu 25–29 January – Another failed Russian counteroffensive in Manchuria
 Battle of Mukden 20 February – 7 March – Largest battle at the time; decisive Japanese victory
 Battle of Tsushima 27–28 May – Admiral Togo's decisive victory over Russian Baltic fleet in the Straits of Tshushima
 Battle of the Malalag River 22 October
 1906
 Battle of Rawdat Muhanna 12 April – Ibn Saud defeat Rashidis in Rawdat Muhanna.
 First Battle of Bud Dajo 5–8 December
 1907
 Battle of Tarafiyah 24 September – Ibn Saud defeat Rashidis in Tarafiyah
 1908
 Battle of Marrakesh 23 August – Mulay Hafid successfully revolts against Moroccan Sultan
 1911
Battle of Casas Grandes 6 March
Second Battle of Bud Dajo 18–26 March
Battle of Cuautla 11–19 May 
Battle of Preveza 29–30 September
Battle of Tripoli 3–10 October
Battle of Benghazi (1911) 20 October
Battle of Shar al-Shatt 23 October
Battle of Ain Zara 4 December
Battle of Tobruk 22 December–9 January – Italy begins the invasion of Libya, Italo-Turkish War
 1912
Battle of Msaya 19 September
Battle of Coyotepe Hill 3–4 October
Capture of Lemnos 8 October – Greek troops occupy the Ottoman-held island of Lemnos
Battle of Sarantaporo 9 October – Greeks defeat Ottomans near Koritza
Battle of Kumanovo 23 October – Serbians defeat Ottomans in N. Macedonia
Battle of Kirk Kelesse 24 October – Bulgarians defeat Ottomans in E. Thrace
Battle of Pente Pigadia 24–30 October – Greeks defeat Ottomans in seven-day battle near Bizani
Battle of Giannitsa 2 November – Greeks defeat Ottoman Turks in Central Macedonia
Battle of Prilep 3 November – Serbians defeat Ottomans
Battle of Kumanovo 23–24 October
Battle of Lule Burgas 31 October – 3 November – Bulgarians compel Ottomans to full retreat toward the lines of Tchataldja, 30 km from Constantinople and the last line of defense for the Ottoman Capital.  In terms of forces engaged it was the largest battle fought in Europe between the end of the Franco-Prussian War and the beginning of the First World War
Battle of Vevi 2 November – Successful Turkish counter offensive against Greek positions
Battle of Monastir 16–19 November – Decisive and final defeat in Macedonia of the Ottomans by the Serbians
Battle of Çatalca 16–17 November – Defeat of Bulgarian advance toward Istanbul
Battle of Lesbos 21 November – 21 December 1912 – Greeks capture the island of Lesbos from the Ottoman Empire
Battle of Chios 24 November 1912 – 3 January 2023 – Greeks capture the island of Chios from the Ottoman Empire
Battle of Elli 3 December – Greek navy defeats Ottoman fleet and forces it to retreat to its base within the Dardanelles straits
 1913
 Battle of Lemnos 5 January – Greek navy defeats Ottoman fleet near the Island of Lemnos in final naval engagement of the war
 Battle of Bizani 20–21 February – Greeks defeat last operational Ottoman army in Epirus and capture city of Ioanina
 Adrianople 3 November 1912 – 26 March 1913 – Fall of Adrianpole to the forces of Bulgaria and Serbia and the capture of Turkish Gen Ghazi Shulkri Pasha
 Battle of Bud Bagsak 11–15 June – The End of the Moro Rebellion
 Battle of Kilkis–Lachanas 19–21 June – Greeks defeat Bulgarians in the three-day battle for Kilkis
 Battle of Bregalnica 30 June – 8 July – Serbs defeat Bulgarians in Second Balkan War
 Battle of Kresna Gorge 8–18 July – Inconclusive ten-day battle between Bulgaria and Greece
 Battle of Kalimantsi 15–18 July – Bulgarian defensive victory against the Serbs
 Battle of Dul Madoba 9 August – A Dervish force raids the Somali Dhulbahante tribe near Burco, killing or wounding 57 members of the "Somaliland Camel Constabulary", including the British commander, Colonel Richard Corfield

1914–1918 
1914: World War I
Liège 4–17 August – Germans invade Belgium; start of World War I See also a List of World War I Battles
 Battle of Mulhouse 9 August – Part of the Battle of the Frontiers, France takes Mulhouse but then loses it again
 Battle of Halen 12 August
Battle of Lorraine 14 August – German victory in World War I
 Battle of Agbeluvhoe 15 August
 Battle of Dinant 15–24 August
Battle of Cer 16–19 August – Serbian forces push back Austro-Hungarian invasion
Battle of Stallupönen 17 August – First battle on the Russian Eastern Front in World War I
Battle of Gumbinnen 19–20 August – Russians defeat German Eighth Army, advance deeper into East Prussia
Battle of the Ardennes 21 August
Battle of Charleroi 21 August
 Battle of Chra 22 August
Battle of Mons 23 August – British forces hold back
Battle of Tannenberg 23 August – 2 September – Samsonov's Russian Second Army encircled and destroyed by the German Eighth Army
Battle of Galicia 23 August-11 September - Russians occupy Eastern Galicia. 
Battle of the Trouée de Charmes 24–26 August – The second French army, under general Castelnau, defeat a Bavarian army
Battle of Le Cateau 26 August – Allied Powers retreat from German forces
Battle of Galicia 26 August – 11 September – Russia defeats Austria-Hungary
First Battle of Heligoland Bight 28 August – First major naval engagement of World War I.  Heavy German losses
Battle of Guise 29 August – The fifth French army, under general Lanzerac, defeat the second German army under general Bülow.
Occupation of German Samoa 29-30 – New Zealand forces defeat German forces in Samoa
Siege of Maubeuge 24 August – 7 September – Germans capture Maubeuge
First Battle of Garua 29–31 August
First Battle of the Marne 5–9 September – French armies and BEF, under French general Joffre, defeat the Germans armies under general Von Moltke. German invasion of France halted by Allies. The city of Paris was saved.
Battle of Nsanakong 4 September
First Battle of the Masurian Lakes 9–14 September – German Eighth Army defeats Rennenkampf's Russian First Army
Battle of Bita Paka 11 September Australian forces defeat German forces in German New Guinea
First Battle of the Aisne 13–28 September – Indecisive battle in France
Battle of Ukoko 21 September
Siege of Przemyśl 24 September 1914 – 22 March 1915 – Russians initially unsuccessful, but second siege attempt succeeds
Battle of Sandfontein 26 September
Siege of Antwerp 28 September
Battle of the Vistula River 29 September – 31 October – Russians defeat Germans under August von Mackensen
Battle of the Yser 16–31 October – French and Belgian victory
Battle of Rufiji Delta October – 11 July 1915 – British empire naval forces defeat German naval forces in East Africa
First Battle of Ypres 19 October – 22 November – Early trench warfare; "Kindermord bei Ypern"
First Battle of Edea 20–26 October
Battle of Penang 28 October – German victory, two allied ships sink near Malaysia
Battle of Coronel 1 November – Admiral Graf Spee defeats Admiral Cradock
Battle of Kilimanjaro 3 November
Battle of Tanga 3–5 November – Colonel Paul von Lettow-Vorbeck defeats General Arthur Aitken in German East Africa
Fao Landing 6 November – British begin the Mesopotamian campaign against the Ottoman Empire in the First World War
Battle of Cocos 9 November – Australia defeats Germany in a naval battle
Battle of Łódź 11 November – Russians take city, lose it on 6 December
Battle of Elhri 13 November – Moroccan tribes defeat French troops
Battle of Kraków 16 November – Heavy casualties to Austria and Russia
Battle of Cape Sarych 18 November - Inconclusive
Battle of Łowicz 30 November – 17 December – Russians take city
Battle of Kolubara 3–9 December – Serbians drive out Austrians
Battle of Falkland Islands 8 December – British defeat Admiral Graf Spee
1915
Second Battle of Edea 5 January
Battle of Jassin 18–19 January – German victory in East Africa
Battle of Dogger Bank 24 January – Admiral Beatty drives off Vice-Admiral Hipper's raiding force, sinks Blücher
First Suez Offensive 28 January – 3 February – Ottoman attack fails
Battle of Bolimów 31 January – Cold weather thwarts German gas attack against Russians
Battle of Kakamas 4 February – Took place in Kakamas, Northern Cape Province of South Africa. It was a skirmish for control of two river fords between contingents of the German and South African armed forces, ending with a South African victory
Second Battle of the Masurian Lakes 7–22 February – Initial German attack is highly successful, but further attacks are repulsed
 Battle of Fort Rivière 17 February
Battle of Gallipoli 19 February 1915 – 8 January 1916 – The Allied powers attempt a failed frontal assault on the Ottoman Empire
Naval assault in strait of Çanakkale 18 March – Turks repel an Allied fleet
Battle of Hill 60 (Western Front) 17–22 April – British empire forces defeat German Empire forces
Second Battle of Ypres 22 April – 25 May – Germans use poison gas
Landing at Cape Helles 25 April – British amphibious assault against the Ottoman Empire. Concurrently a French assault in the Asiatic side of the straits
Landing at Anzac Cove 25 April – 3 May – Australia and New Zealand successfully land but later get bogged down
Battle of Trekkopjes 26 April
First Battle of Krithia 28 April – British attack against Turks fails
Battle of Gurin 29 April
Battle for Baby 700 2–3 May – ANZAC attack on Baby 700 defended by Ottoman forces
Second Battle of Krithia 6–8 May – Second British attack against Turks uses same plan, also fails
Third attack on Anzac Cove 19 May – ANZAC forces defeat Ottoman attack
Second Battle of Garua 31 May – 10 June
Second attack on Anzac Cove 27 April – Ottoman Empire forces attack Australian and New Zealand forces
Third Battle of Krithia 4 June – Temporary British success reversed by Ottoman counter-attack
Battle of Bukoba 21–23 June
Battle of Gully Ravine 28 June – 5 July – British and Indian forces defeat Ottoman Empire
First Battle of the Isonzo 23 June – 7 July – Failed Italian attack on Austrian positions in the Alps
Second Battle of the Isonzo 18 July – 3 August – Second attempt on Austrian positions fails
Battle of Chunuk Bair 6–10 August – Ottomans defeat Britain and New Zealand
Battle of Lone Pine 6–12 August – Australians stop Ottoman attack, but it was only a diversion
Battle of Krithia Vineyard 6–13 August – Turkish diversionary attack to allow for Sari Bair Offensive
Landing at Suvla Bay 6–15 August – The main attack for which the two diversions were staged.  Ottoman victory
Battle of the Nek 7 August – Ottomans defeat Australians
Battle of Scimitar Hill 21 August – Decisive battle of the Gallipoli Campaign, Ottoman victory
Battle of Hill 60 (Gallipoli) – Final British attempt to take Gallipoli fails
Battle of Loos 25 September – 14 October
Battle of Es Sinn 28 September
Third Battle of the Isonzo 18 October – 3 November – Austrians endure massive Italian bombardment
Battle of Fort Dipitie 24–25 October
Battle of Banjo 4–6 November
Battle of Ctesiphon 22–25 November – Indecisive battle between British and Ottoman forces
Siege of Kut 7 December 1915 – 29 April 1916 – Ottoman forces capture the city and force the surrender of the British Army of Mesopotamia under General Sir Charles Vere Ferrers Townshend, KCB, DSO. Largest British surrender of the war.
1916
Battle of Salaita Hill 12 February
Battle of Verdun 21 February – 15 December – The great German offensive was repulsed by the heroic second French army. Verdun was not taken by Germans troops. French win a strategic defensive victory.
Battle of Dujaila 8 March – Failed British attempt to relieve the Siege of Kut
Battle of Asiago 11 March – Massive Austrian counter-offensive against Italy
 Battle of Kahe 18 March
 Battle of Latema Nek 11–12 March
Raid on Jifjafa 11–14 April – Successful Australian raid on Ottoman forces
Easter Rising 24 April – Irish rebellion against the British occupation centered in Dublin
Battle of Bondoa Irangi 7–10 May
Battle of Jutland 31 May – Last engagement of the German High Seas Fleet
Brusilov Offensive 4 June – 20 September – Russia nearly collapses Austria but losses are staggering
2nd Battle of Albert 1 July – Opening day of the Allied Power offensive known as the Battle of the Somme
Battle of the Somme 1 July – 18 November – Inconclusive major Allied offensive on the western front
Battle of Guayacanas 3 July
Battle of Kostiuchnówka 4–6 July - One of the deadliest battles for the Polish Legions
Battle of Bazentin Ridge 14 July – British victory during the Somme offensive
Battle of Fromelles 19–20 July – German victory south of the rest of the Somme offensive, darkest day in Australian history
Battle of Pozières 23 July – 7 August – British and Australian forces take and hold town
Battle of Romani 3 August – Turkish advance on Suez Canal defeated
Sixth Battle of the Isonzo 6–17 August – Italian victory
Battle of Mouquet Farm 8 August – 27 September – Allied Powers advance toward German fortification
Battle of Bir el Abd 9 August – Ottoman victory against British Empire forces
Battle of Mlali 24 August
Battle of Guillemont 3–9 September – Allied Powers capture city
Battle of Herkulesfürdő 6–10 September
Battle of Kisaki 7–11 September
Battle of Ginchy 9 September – Irish capture town from Germans, but suffer heavy casualties
Battle of Flers–Courcelette 15–22 September – Bad weather thwarts Allied attempt to break through German defenses
Battle of Morval 25 September – British progress resumes after Fleurs-Courcelette, but French unable to match British progress
Battle of Thiepval Ridge 26–28 September – German positions captured by Allied Powers
Battle of Le Transloy 1 October – 5 November – Failed attempt to capture German defenses
Battle of Kőhalom 2 October
Battle of Cinghinarele Island 2–8 October
Battle of the Ancre 13 November – Allied Powers advance further, final battle of the 1916 Somme Campaign
Battle of Segale – Negus Mikael, marching on the Ethiopian capital in support of his son Emperor Iyasu V, is defeated by Fitawrari Habte Giyorgis, securing the throne for Empress Zauditu
Battle of San Francisco de Macorís 29 November
Battle of Magdhaba 23 December – Capture of Turkish garrison in the Sinai
1917
Battle of Rafa 9 January – Capture of Turkish garrison in the Sinai
 Second Battle of Kut 23 February – British forces once again take Kut
 Fall of Baghdad 8–11 March – British forces capture the city
 Battle of Nambanje 13 March
Battle of Mount Hamrin 25 March
First Battle of Gaza 26 March – British fail to advance into Palestine
Vimy Ridge 9 April – Canada's finest hour
Battle of Arras (1917) 9 April – 16 May – British Empire forces advance but no breakthrough was achieved
Nivelle Offensive 16 April – 9 May indecisive Allied offensive on western front
Second Battle of Gaza 19 April – Turkey repels British assault on Gaza-Beersheba line
Battle of Istabulat 21 April
Action of 4 May 1917 4 May – British and Australian naval forces indecisive action against German navy and zeppelin
Raid on the Beersheba to Hafir el Auja railway 23 May – Australian and New Zealand forces raid and destroy Ottoman railway
Battle of Messines (1917) 7–14 June – British empire forces advance on western front
Battle of Mount Ortigara 10–25 June
Battle of Zboriv 1–2 July – Part of Kerensky Offensive; the only successful engagement of the last Russian offensive in WWI
Battle of Aqaba 6 July
Battle of Passchendaele 31 July – Also known as Third Battle of Ypres. Three-month battle costs Britain 400,000
Battle of Pilckem Ridge 31 July – 2 August – Allied victory over German forces
Battle of Langemarck (1917) 16–18 August – Indecisive battle between Anglo French forces and German forces
Battle of Megiddo (1918) 19–25 September
Battle of the Menin Road Ridge 20–26 September – British Empire victory over Germany
Battle of Broodseinde 4 October – British, Australian, New Zealand victory against German forces on the western front
Battle of Poelcappelle 9 October – Australian and British forces fight inconclusive battle against German forces
Battle of Wadi Musa 23 October
Battle of Caporetto 24 October – Also known as the Twelfth Battle of the Isonzo. Italians defeated by Central Powers, driven back to Venice
Second Battle of Passchendaele 26 October – 10 November – Allied victory over Germany on western front
Battle of Beersheba 31 October – Australian light horse capture Beersheba
Third Battle of Gaza 31 October – 7 November – British break Turkish defensive line in southern Palestine
Battle of Tel el Khuweilfe 1–6 November – British empire forces defeat Ottoman forces
Battle of Hareira and Sheria 6–7 November – British, New Zealand and Australian forces Ottoman army
Battle of Mughar Ridge 13 November – British empire forces gain victory over Ottoman forces
Battle of Ayun Kara 14 November
Second Battle of Heligoland Bight 17 November – Indecisive naval battle, Germans lose one torpedo boat
Battle of Cambrai 20 November – 7 December – First successful use of tanks
Battle of Ngomano 25 November – Germans defeat Portuguese and launch invasion of Portuguese East Africa.
Battle of Polygon Wood 26 September – 3 October – Australian and British forces defeat German forces
Battle of Buqqar Ridge 27 October – British and Australian victory over Ottoman Empire forces
Battle of Jerusalem 8–26 December – British forces capture Jerusalem from the Ottoman Empire.
1918
Battle of Kämärä 27 January
Battle of Kruty 29/30 January
Battle of Vilppula 31 January – 18 March
Battle of Bobruysk 2 February – 11 March – Units of the Polish I Corps in Russia, fought with the Red Army over the control of the city of Babruysk.
First Battle of Kiev 5–8 February - Bolsheviks capture Kyiv
Battle of Ruovesi 5 February – 19 March
Battle of Antrea 11 February – 25 April
Battle of Rarańcza 15–16 February
Capture of Jericho 19–20 February – Australians capture Jericho from Ottoman forces
Battle of Varkaus 19–21 February
Battle of Rautu (1918) 21 February – 5 April
Battle of Tell 'Asur 8–12 March – British and Australian forces defeat Ottoman forces
Battle of Bakhmach 8–13 March – Czechoslovak Legion escape German encirclement
Battle of Tampere 8 March – 6 April – In the Finnish Civil War, the bloodiest battle in Finnish history at the time.
Battle of Länkipohja 16 March
First Transjordan attack on Amman 21 March – 2 April – Ottoman Empire forces defeat British empire forces
First Battle of Amman 27-31 – March Ottoman Empire victory over British Empire forces
First Battle of Morlancourt 28–30 March – Australians lead by John Monash defeat Germans
First Battle of Villers-Bretonneux 20 March – 5 April – Australian victory over German forces
Battle of the Avre 4–5 April – German attack fought between German forces and defending Australian and British forces
Second Battle of Dernancourt 5 April – Australian forces halt German advance on Amiens
Battle of Ahvenkoski 10 April – 5 May
Battle of Helsinki 12–13 April
Battle of Lahti 19 April – 1 May
Second Battle of Villers-Bretonneux 24–25 April – Australian forces capture the town
Battle of Vyborg 24–29 April
Battle of Syrjäntaka 28–29 April
Second Battle of Morlancourt 4–14 May – Australian victory over German forces on western front
Battle of Cantigny 28 May – U.S. First Division wins in first independent action
Third Battle of Morlancourt 10 June – Australian forces defeat German forces
Battle of Barnaul (1918) 13–15 June - White Russian victory
Battle of the Piave River 15–23 June – Downfall of Austria
Battle of Belleau Wood 25 June – U.S. Second Division Marines capture woods
Battle of Hamel 4 July – Australian success with departure from massed frontal assaults birth of 20th century combined arms warfare
Battle of Abu Tellul 14 July – British, Australian and Indian forces successfully defend against German/Ottoman attacks
Second Battle of the Marne 15–18 July – French troops, helped by American and British troops, win a great and decisive victory against Germans armies and saved Paris. 95,000 French soldiers killed or wounded, 12,000 Americans killed or wounded and 12,000 British killed or wounded. 180,000 Germans soldiers killed or wounded.
Battle of Chateau Thierry 18 July
Capture of Kazan by the White Army 5–7 August - White Army captures Kazan
Battle of Amiens 8–11 August – British force Germans to Hindenburg line
Hundred Days Offensive 8 August – 11 November – Last major allied offensive on the western front and the near collapse of the German Army
Battle of Lake Baikal 16 August - Czechoslovak forces defeat Reds
Battle of the Ailette 17–23 August
Second Battle of the Somme (1918) 21 August – 2 September – Allied victory over German forces
Battle of Baku 26 August – 14 September – The Army of Islam of Ottoman Empire captures the city of Baku
Battle of Ambos Nogales 27 August – Americans defeat Mexicans
Battle of Mont Saint-Quentin 31 August – 3 September – Australian forces capture Mont Saint-Quentin, Henry Rawlinson, 1st Baron Rawlinson calls it the greatest military achievement of the war
Kazan Operation 5–10 September - Second battle of Kazan, Red Army recaptures the city
Battle of Havrincourt 12 September – British victory, German morale begins to weaken
Battle of Saint-Mihiel 12–19 September – Americans defeat Germans
Battle of Épehy 18 September – British and Australians defeat Germans
Battle of Megiddo 19 September – Allenby's British crush Ottoman army
Battle of Tulkarm 19 September – British empire victory over Ottomans
Battle of Tabsor 19–20 September – British Empire victory over Ottoman forces
Battle of Sharon 19–25 September – British Empire victory over Ottoman Empire
Battle of Nablus (1918) 19–25 September – British empire victory over Ottomans
Capture of Jenin 20 September – Australian and British forces capture Jenin from the Ottoman Empire
Second Battle of Amman 25 September – British Empire forces land victory over Ottoman forces
Capture of Damascus 26 September – 1 October – Australian light horse capture the city of Damascus from Ottoman forces
Battle of Meuse 26 September – 11 November – Argonne Forest, largest AEF action of the war; Allied victory. (In it, 8 October, Cpl. Alvin York, outnumbered 19:1, leads capture of German machine-gun nest)
Battle of Jisr Benat Yakub 27 September – Australian and British forces defeat Ottoman forces
Battle of St Quentin Canal 29 September – 10 October – British, Australian and American forces decisive allied victory over German forces
Battle of Dibrivka 30 September – Insurgents defeat Austro-German forces
Battle of Durazzo (1918) 2 October – Allied naval forces defeat Austro-Hungarian naval forces
Pursuit to Haritan 3–27 October – British Empire forces defeat Ottoman forces final phase of the middle east campaign in ww1
Battle of Vittorio Veneto 24 October – 3 November
Battle of Aleppo (1918) 25 October – Allied victory against Ottoman/German forces
Second Battle of the Sambre 4 November – Allied Power victory during final phase of World War I
Battle of Przemyśl 11–12 November – Polish forces capture town from Ukrainians
Battle of Tulgas 11–14 November
First North Caucasus Operation December–January 1919 - Whites capture all of the Northern Caucasus minus Astrakhan.

1919–1938 

1919
Battle of Ławica 9 January
Battle for the Donbas (1919) 12 January-31 May - White Army victory
Battle of Utria 17–20 January – Estonian victory in the Estonian War of Independence.
Battle of Laagna 18 January – Estonian victory.
Battle of Shenkursk 19–25 January
Battle of Vystavka 27 January-early March - Bolsheviks defeat Americans
Battle of Skoczów 28–30 January
Battle of Paju 31 January – Estonians and Finnish volunteers defeat the Red Latvian Riflemen in Southern-Estonia.
Battle of Bereza Kartuska 14 February – Polish victory during Polish–Bolshevik War, and the first battle of the war
Battle of Mariupol 19–27 March - Soviets and Makhnovists capture Mariupol
Battle of Bolshie Ozerki 31 March – 2 April
Battle of Lida (1919) 16–17 April
Battle of Mospyne 13 May - White Army defeats Makhnovists
Battle of Alexandrovsky Fort 21 May
Third Battle of Ciudad Juarez 15–16 June – Americans and Carrancistas defeat Villistas
Battle of Bergama 15–20 June
First Kharkiv Operation 20–25 June - White Army captures Kharkiv
Battle of Cēsis 23 June – Estonian and Latvian victory over the German Landeswehr
Battle of Romanovka 25 June
Battle of Aydın 27 June – 4 July
Battle of Novo Litovoskaya 7 August - US forces defeat Bolsheviks
Battle of Bogdat 25 September-19 October - White Russian victory
Battle of Peregonovka 26 September
Battle of Petrograd 28 September-14 November - White Army fails to capture Saint Petersburg
Battle of Lwów 1 November 1918 – 30 May 1919 – Polish city besieged by Ukrainian forces
Donbas operation (1919) 18–31 December - Red Army captures Donbas
Battle of Krivasoo 18 November – 30 December – Estonian victory
Khopyor–Don Operation 20 November-8 December - Red victory
Second Kharkiv Operation 24 November-12 December - Red offensive towards Kharkiv, resulting in its capture
Third Battle of Kiev 10–16 December - Bolsheviks regain control of Kyiv
First Battle of Berezina - Polish victory
1920
Battle of Daugavpils 3–5 January - Polish-Latvian victory
Rostov–Novocherkassk Operation 6–10 January - Red victory, splitting the White Army in two
Battle of Posolskeya 9 January - Last battle of the Russian Civil War to involve the US
Second North Caucasus Operation 17 January-7 April - Reds force Whites out of the North Caucasus and into Georgia and Azerbaijan, which the Reds later invade.
Battle of Letychiv 18–22 February - Polish victory
Battle of Urfa 9 February – 11 April
Battle of Koziatyn 25–27 April
Battle of Czarnobyl 27 April - Poles capture Chernobyl
Action of 3 May 1920 - A French and Soviet ship fight
Battle of Geyve 15–17 May
Anzali Operation 18 May - Soviet victory
Battle of Wołodarka 29–31 May – Polish victory during Polish–Bolshevik War
Battle of Bystryk 31 May – Polish victory by surprise attack
Battle of Boryspil 2 June – Polish capture Russian supplies
Battle of Borodzianka 11–13 June - Polish victory
Battle of Romanovka 25 June
Battle of Głębokie 4–6 July
Battle of Chorupań 13–19 July - Soviet victory over Dubno and Chorupan.
First Battle of Grodno 19–20 July - Soviets capture Hrodna
Battle of Maysalun 23 July – The French advance into Syria and defeat Yusuf al-Azmah's hastily assembled army
Battle of Lwów July–September - Poles hold Lviv
Battle of Radzymin 12–15 August – Town changes hands twice during Polish–Bolshevik War
Battle of Warsaw 13–25 August – Poles defeat Red Army
Battle of Radzymin 13–16 August - Polish victory
Battle of Ossów 14 August - One of the rare Polish victories during the Battle of Warsaw
Battle of Chołojów 14 August - Soviet victory
Battle of Nasielsk 14–15 August – Minor Polish victory as part of the action around Warsaw
Battle of Borkowo 14–15 August - Minor Polish victory
Battle of Sarnowa Góra 14–15 August - Polish victory
Battle of Kock 14–16 August - Polish victory
Ulagay's Landing 14 August-7 September - Red Army takes control of Crimea, the last White stronghold.
Battle of Cyców 15–16 August
Battle of Dęblin and Mińsk Mazowiecki 16–18 August – Polish victory as part of the counteroffensive after Battle of Warsaw
Battle of Zadwórze 17 August – Polish army defeated by the Red Army forces of Semyon Budennyi
Battle of Przasnysz 21 August - Soviet victory
Battle of Białystok 22 August
Battle of Sakarya 23 August – 13 September
Bukhara operation (1920) 28 August-2 September - Fall of the Emirate of Bukhara
Battle of Giby 30 August – Lithuanian withdrawal successfully mediated by French at request of Poland during Polish–Lithuanian War
Battle of Komarów 30 August – 2 September
Battle of Komarow 31 August – Decisive Polish victory
Battle of Sejny 2–19 September - Polish victory against Lithuania
Battle of Vlora 3 September – Albanian patriots seize Vlora from Italian control in a rapid night strike
Battle of Kobryń (1920) 11–23 September
Battle of Obytichnyi Spit 15 September - Red and White army ships interact outside Berdiansk, with both sides claiming victory.
Battle of the Niemen River 15–25 September – Poles defeat the reserves of the Red Army
Battle of Dytiatyn 16 September - Soviet victory
Battle of Brzostowica 20–25 September - Polish victory
Battle of Obuchowo 26 September - Polish victory
Battle of Peregonovka 26 September - Insurgent victory
Battle of Krwawy Bór 27–28 September - Polish victory
Battle of Sarıkamış 29 September 
Battle of Kanlı Geçit 1 November
Battle of Ballinalee 3 November
Battle of Alexandropol 7 November
Kilmichael Ambush 28 November – Important battle in the Irish War of Independence
1921
 Action of 9 January 1921 - French ship destroys Russian ship in the Black Sea
 First Battle of İnönü 9–11 January – Greek reconnaissance-in-force, Turkish victory. (Greco-Turkish War of the Turkish War of Independence)
 Second Battle of İnönü 26–31 March – Turkish forces victorious. (Greco-Turkish War)
 Battle of Alexandrovsky Fort 21 May - Brits defeat Red Russians in the Caspian Sea
 Advance on Moscow (1919) 3 July-18 November - Beginning of the end of Armed Forces of South Russia
 Battle of Annual 22 July – Near Annual, Morocco, Spanish army loses to Rifi Berbers of Muhammad Ibn 'Abd al-Karim al-Khattabi
 Battle of Sakarya – Turkish victory, farthest Greek advance in the Greco-Turkish War
1922
 Battle of Volochayevka 5–14 February - Reds retake Khabarovsk
 Battle of Dumlupınar – Turkish victory, final battle of the Greco-Turkish War
 Battle of Dublin – First and probably most important battle of the Irish Civil War
 Battle of Kilmallock – Battle of the Irish Civil War
1923
 Beer Hall Putsch 8–9 November – Failed Nazi Party uprising in Munich, Hitler wounded and captured
1924
 Battle of Mecca – Mecca became a Saudi Arabian territory
1925
Battle of Jeddah 10 February – Jeddah became a Saudi Arabian territory.  End of Kingdom of Hejaz
Battle of al-Kafr 22 July
Battle of al-Mazraa 2–3 August
Alhucemas landing 8 September – Spanish amphibious landing including tanks and air support
Battle of al-Musayfirah 17 September
Battle of Rashaya 20–24 November
1927
Battle of La Paz Centro 16 May
Battle of Ocotal 16 July
Battle of San Fernando 25 July
Battle of Santa Clara 27 July
Battle of Telpaneca 19 September
Battle of Sapotillal 9 October
Battle of Humen–Shijing 18 November
1928
Battle of El Bramadero 27–28 February
Battle of La Flor 13–14 May
1929
Battle of Sabilla 29–31 March
Battle of Yichang (1929) 11 April
Battle of Tepatitlán 19 April
First Battle of Guilin 15 May
Second Battle of Guangzhou 17–21 May
Battle of Northern Henan 27 May
Battle of Liuzhou 7–18 June
Battle of Guiping 21 June
1930
Battle of Anchem 31 March – Ras Gugsa Welle is defeated by Dejazmach Mulugeta Yeggazu, suppressing the last obstacle to Ras Tafari Makonnen's ascension to Ethiopia's throne
Battle of Xuchang 10–12 June
Battle of Shangcai (1930) 16 June
Battle of Guanghua 3 July
Second Battle of Guilin 17 July
Battle of Jinan (1930) 14 August
Second Battle of Nanning 15 August – 22 October
Battle of Xinzheng 5–8 October
 1931
 Mukden Incident 18 September – Japanese forces create a pretext to invade Manchuria, start of Second Sino-Japanese War
1932
First Battle of Shanghai 28 January – 3 March – Ceasefire declared
Battle of Rehe 21 February – 1 March
Battle of Boquerón 7 – 29 September – First major battle during the Chaco War and a Paraguayan victory
Battle of Agua Carta 26 September
Battle of El Sauce 26 December
Emu War 10 November - Minor battle between the Australians and the emus.
 1933
Defense of the Great Wall 1 January – 31 May – Japanese victory
First Battle of Nanawa 20–26 January – Paraguayan victory
Battle of Rehe 21 February – 1 March – Japanese victory
Second Battle of Nanawa 4–9 July – Paraguayan victory
Battle of Gondra 11–15 July 
 1935
 Battle of Khalkhyn Temple 8 January
 Battle of Chishui River 19 January – 22 March
 1936
Battle of Ganale Dorya 7–10 January – General Rodolfo Graziani attacks troops under Ras Desta Damtew; after over three days of slaughter, the Ethiopians break and flee
 The First Battle of Tembien 20–24 January – Ethiopian forces suffer 8,000 casualties compared to Italy's 1,100
Battle of Amba Aradam 10 February – Ethiopians under Ras Mulugeta Yeggazu counterattack the invading Italians southwest of Chalacot, but are defeated with heavy losses
Second Battle of Tembien 27 February
 Battle of Shire 29 February – 2 March
Battle of Maychew 31 March – Emperor Haile Selassie leads in person the final Ethiopian counter-attack of the Second Italo-Abyssinian War, which is a crushing Ethiopian defeat
Battle of the Ogaden 15–25 April – Final battle during the Italian invasion of Ethiopia.  By 5 May, Emperor Haile Selassie has gone into exile and Italians have declared victory
 Battle of Mérida 10–11 August – Spanish Nationalist victory
Battle of Badajoz 14 August – Nationalists storm Badajoz
 Battle of Irún 19 August – 5 September – Nationalist victory
 Battle of Monte Pelado 28 August – Republican victory
 Battle of Talavera de la Reina (1936) 3 September
 Battle of Cerro Muriano 5–6 September – Republican victory, the Falling Soldier photograph was taken during this battle by Robert Capa
 Battle of Seseña 29 October – Nationalist victory over Republicans and Soviets
 Battle of Ciudad Universitaria 15–23 November – Spanish Republican victory
 First Battle of the Corunna Road 29 November – 3 December
 Second Battle of the Corunna Road 13 December – 15 January 1937
Battle of Lopera 27–29 December – Nationalist victory
 1937
Battle of Gogetti 19 February – Battle between the Italian occupation forces and the remnants of the Ethiopian armies. The surviving elements of the Ethiopian armies of Sidamo and Bale are encircled and destroyed by the Italian forces near Lake Shala
Battle of Guadalajara 8–23 March – Spanish Republicans defeat Italians
Battle of Gernika 26–28 April – Franco's forces capture Guernica following a Luftwaffe bombing
 Battle of Albarracín 5 July – 11 August – Nationalist Victory
Battle of Lugou Bridge 7 July – Japanese victory triggered outbreak of the Sino-Japanese War
Battle of Beiping-Tianjin 25–31 July – Japanese victory
Second Battle of Shanghai 13 August – 9 November – Japanese victory
 Battle of Santander 14 August – 17 September
 Battle of Taiyuan 1 September – 9 November – Japanese victory
Battle of El Mazuco 6–22 September – Nationalist victory
 Battle of Xinkou 13 September – 8 November – Japanese victory
Battle of Pingxingguan 25 September – Chinese victory
Battle of Nanjing early November – 13 December – Japanese victory
 1938
Battle of Alfambra 5–8 February – Nationalist victory
Battle of Cape Palos 5–6 March – Republican victory
Battle of Caspe 16–17 March – Nationalist victory
Battle of Xuzhou 24 March – 1 May – Japanese victory
Battle of Tai er zhuang 27 March – Chinese victory
Battle of Gandesa 1–3 April – Nationalist victory
Battle of Wuhan 11 July – 27 October – Japanese pyrrhic victory
Battle of the Ebro 25 July – 16 November – Spanish Republicans launch attacks across the Ebro river. The purpose of the battle is to relieve pressure off Valencia and Catalonia. It is soon to become the decisive battle of the war, and a Republican defeat
Battle of Lake Khasan 29 July 1938 – 11 August 1938 – In Manchuria between forces of the Soviet Union and Japan

1939–1945 

1939: World War II
Hungarian invasion of Carpatho-Ukraine 15 March 1939 - 17 March 1939 - Hungarian forces defeat Carpatho-Ukraine
Battle of Nanchang 17 March – 9 May – Japanese forces defeat Nationalist Chinese
 Battle of Suixian-Zaoyang 24 May – Chinese counterattack successful
 Battle of Khalkhin Gol 1 May 1939 – 16 September 1939
 Invasion of Poland 1 September – 6 October – Start of World War II in Europe, German victory. See also List of World War II battles
 Battle of the Border 1–4 September - Collective term for battles between Germany and Poland in the first days of the Invasion.
 Battle of Danzig Bay 1 September
 Battle of Chojnice 1 September - Germans capture Chojnice
 Charge at Krojanty 1 September - Failed Polish counterattack
 Battle of Mokra 1 September - First German defeat in Poland, and one of the only Polish victories in the invasion
 Battle of Lasy Królewskie 1 September - Polish victory
 Defence of the Polish Post Office in Danzig 1 September - Polish forces hold up in the Polish post office, but fail to defend it
 Battle of Mikołów 1–2 September – German tactical victory during the Invasion of Poland
 Battle of Pszczyna 1–2 September - German victory
 Battle of Mikołów 1–2 September - German victory
 Battle of Mława 1–3 September - German victory
 Battle of Jordanów 1–3 September - German victory
 Battle of Częstochowa 1–3 September - German victory
 Battle of Węgierska Górka 1–3 September - German victory
 Battle of Grudziądz 1–4 September - German victory
 Battle of Tuchola Forest 1–5 September
 Battle of Westerplatte 1–7 September - First battle in the Invasion of Poland
 Raid on Fraustadt 2 September - Polish insurgents successfully raid a German town
 Battle of Borowa Góra 2–5 September - German victory
 Battle of Bukowiec 3 September - German victory
 Defense of Katowice 3–4 September - Polish Boy and Girl Scout units irregularly defend Katowice but fail
 Battle of Piotrków Trybunalski 4–6 September - Polish withdrawal
 Battle of Różan 4–6 September - German victory
 Battle of Tomaszów Mazowiecki 6 September - German victory
 Battle of Pułtusk 6–7 September - Poles lose Pultusk
 Battle of Łódź 6–8 September - German victory
 Battle of Barak 7–8 September - Polish retreat
 Battle of Wizna 7–10 September - German victory
 Battle of Łomża 7–10 September - German victory
 Battle of Wola Cyrusowa 8 September - Pyrrhic German victory
 Battle of Radom 8–9 September - Germans capture Radom
 Battle of Gdynia 8–14 September - Germans capture Gdynia
 Battle of Warsaw 8–28 September
Battle of the Bzura River 9–19 September - Largest Polish counterattack, but it failed
Battle of Kampinos Forest 9–20 September - German victory
Battle of Hel 9 September-2 October
Battle of Jarosław 10–11 September - German victory
Battle of Kępa Oksywska 10–19 September
 Battle of Kałuszyn 11–12 September
 Battle of Przemyśl 11–14 September - German victory
 First Battle of Lwów 12–22 September - Germans capture Lviv
 Battle of Modlin 13–29 September - Pyrrhic German victory
 Battle of Jaworów 14–16 September - Poles hold Yavoriv
 Battle of Brześć Litewski 14–17 September - Germans capture Brest.
 Battle of Kobryń 14–18 September - Inconclusive
 First Battle of Changsha 17 September-6 October – Chinese forces successfully defend city.  Heavy Japanese casualties
 Battle of Tomaszów Lubelski 17–26 September - Second largest battle in the Invasion of Poland
 Battle of Wilno 18–19 September - Soviets capture Vilnius, which is transferred to Lithuania
 Battle of Wólka Węglowa 19 September - Polish victory
 Battle of Krasnystaw 19–20 September - Failed Polish counterattack
 Battle of Łomianki 19-? September - Failed Polish counterattack
 Battle of Grodno 20–22 September - Soviets capture Hrodna
 Battle of Cześniki 21–22 September - Polish victory
 Battle of Krasnobród 23 September - Successful Polish counterattack, and one of the last battles using cavalry in Europe
 Battle of Husynne 23 September - Soviet victory
 Battle of Kodziowce 23–24 September - Poles hold the town, but later retreat to Lithuania
 Battle of Władypol 27 September - Soviets capture Wladypol (now Vladypil in Ukraine)
 Battle of Szack 28 September - Poles hold the town from the Soviets
 Battles of Parczew, Jabłoń and Milanów 29–30 September - Poles hold the towns from Soviets
 Battle of Wytyczno 1 October
Battle of Kock 2–5 October - Last battle in Invasion of Poland
Battle of Suomussalmi 30 November-8 January - First battle of the Winter War, and the most notable Finnish victory
Battle of Petsamo 30 November-12 March – Russian victory during Winter War
Battle of Salla 30 November-13 March – Finnish victory during Winter War
Battle of Taipale 6–27 December - Finnish victory
Battle of Kollaa 7 December-13 March - Finnish victory
Battle of Suomussalmi 8 December – 7 January 1940 – During Winter War, Hjalmar Siilasvuo leads Finnish to victory over Soviets
Battle of Varolampi Pond 10–11 December - Finnish hold the pond in what's called the "Sausage War"
Battle of Tolvajärvi 12 December – Colonel Paavo Talvela's Finnish forces defeat Soviet Union forces
Battle of the River Plate 13 December – Admiral Graf Spee chased into Montevideo harbour and scuttled
 First Battle of Summa 16 – 22 December – Finnish attack thwarted during Winter War
 Battle of Kelja 25–27 December - Finnish victory
1940
 Battle of the Atlantic 1940-1945 – Name given to the conflicts in the Atlantic Ocean throughout World War II
 Battle of South Henan – Chinese Nationalists led by Li Zongren defeat Japanese
 Battle of Raate Road 1–7 January - Finnish victory
 Second Battle of Summa 1–15 February – Finnish attack thwarted during Winter War
 Battle of Kuhmo 28 January-13 March - Stalemate
 Battle of Honkaniemi 25–27 February – Only tank action of the Winter War
 First Battle of Vyborg Bay 2–13 March - Ceasefire
 Battle of Drøbak Sound 9 April – German naval attack thwarted by Norwegian forces
 Battle of Midtskogen 9–10 April – Norwegian forces defeat German raiding party
 Battle of Dombås 14–19 April – Norwegian Army units defeat German Fallschirmjäger attack
 Battle of Narvik 9 April – 10 June – A minor Allied victory in the Arctic
 Battle at the Afsluitdijk 12–14 May
 Battle of France 9–22 June – Germany takes on France, British Expeditionary Force and French Army defeated
 Battle for The Hague 10 May – The first major air-landing operation in history
 Battle of the Netherlands 10–17 May – Germany invades The Netherlands.
 Battle of Maastricht 10 May – Maastricht was a key city for the German advance
 Battle of Mill 10–11 May – Dutch troops manage to hold back a German battalion
 Battle of Rotterdam 10–14 May – German attempt to seize the Dutch city. It ended in a German victory, following the Rotterdam Blitz
 Battle of the Grebbeberg 11–13 May – A major engagement during the Battle of the Netherlands, operation Fall Gelb
 Battle of Dunkirk 27 May – 5 June – Escape of defeated British Expeditionary Forces
 Battle of Mers-el-Kebir 3 July – British navy destroys Vichy Fleet off the coast of North Africa
 Battle of Calabria 9 July – British forces fight indecisive naval battle with Italians
 Battle of Cape Spada 19 July – British and Australian forces sink an Italian cruiser
 Battle of Britain 10 July – 31 October – Germans try to bomb Britain into submission – RAF answers with fighters
 Battle of Hundred Regiments 20 August – 5 December – Major engagement of the Red Army against the Japanese Imperial Army
 Skirmish at Diosig 4 September - Romanian victory
 Battle of Taranto 11–12 November – British carrier-based planes destroy Italian fleet at Taranto Harbor
 Battle of Cape Spartivento 27 November – British Navy under James Somerville fights indecisive battle with Italy
1941
Battle of Bardia 3–5 January – British/Australian victory in Libya
 Battle of Keren 3 February – 1 April – Hard-fought British and Commonwealth victory over Italian forces during East African Campaign
 Battle of Beda Fomm 6–7 February – British/Australian victory over Italian forces in Libya
Battle of Shanggao 14 March – 9 April – Chinese victory
Battle of Cape Matapan 28 March – British Royal Navy task force defeats Italian fleet
Siege of Tobruk 31 March – 27 November – Erwin Rommel defeated in North Africa
Battle of Greece 6–24 April – Germany takes the Balkan Peninsula after Italian Stalemate
Battle of Tempe Gorge 18 April Australians and New Zealanders slow German advance
Battle of Athens 20 April – dog-fighting air battle over Athens fought for half an hour between the Royal Air Force and the Luftwaffe towards the end of the Battle of Greece
Battle of Thermopylae (1941) German victory over New Zealanders and Australians
Battle of Vevi (1941) - German victory over Australians
Battle of the Corinth Canal 26 April German victory over British empire forces 
Battle of South Shanxi 7–27 May – Japanese victory in China
Battle of Rethymno 20 May - Australian tactical victory
Battle of Denmark Strait 23 May –  sinks 
Sinking of the Bismarck 27 May – Famous German battleship is lost
Battle of Crete 20 May – 1 June – German paratroopers capture Crete, suffer many casualties
Battle of 42nd Street Australian & New Zealanders halt German advance
Battle of the Litani River 9 June – British/Australian victory over Vichy French forces in Syria.
Battle of Jezzine (1941) 13 June – Australians defeat Vichy French
Battle of Sidon (1941) 13–17 June – Australians defeat Vichy French
Battle of Kissoué 17 June – British Empire and Free French forces defeat Vichy French in Syria.
Battle of Merdjayoun 19–24 June - British Empire forces defeat Vichy French
Operation Barbarossa 22 June – German invasion of the Soviet Union
Battle of Białystok-Minsk 22–29 June – German victory in Belarus
Battle of Raseiniai 23–27 June – German victory in Lithuania
Raid on Constanța 26 June - Axis victory
Battle of Brody 26–30 June – One of the largest tank battles of World War II
Battle of Kiev 7 July – 26 September – The largest encirclement battle of World War II
Battle of Uman 15 July-8 August - Axis victory
Battle of Beirut (1941) 12 July – Australian and allied forces defeat Vichy French forces
Battle of Smolensk 6 July – 5 August – Soviet attempt to block Wehrmacht's advance on Moscow
Battle of Damour 5–9 July – Australians defeat Vichy French
Battle of Borodino July – Seven-day battle between the Soviet and the German armies
Battle of Uman 8 August – German victory over Soviet Union
Siege of Leningrad 8 September 1941 – 27 January 1944 – City endures three-year Nazi siege
Second Battle of Changsha 6 September – 8 October – Failed Japanese attempt to take city
Battle of the Sea of Azov 26 September-11 October - Axis controls Sea of Azov
Battle of Rostov 27 November – Germans forced to withdraw despite Hitler's orders, but Soviets suffer over 140,000 casualties
Battle of Malaya 8 December 1941 – 15 February 1942 – Japan invades Malaysia
Battle of Kota Bharu 8 December – Japanese forces capture Kota Bharu
Battle of Prachuab Khirikhan 8–9 December – Japan conquers Thailand
Naval Battle of Singapore 10 December – Japanese torpedo craft sunk HMS Prince of Wales and HMS Repulse
Battle of Jitra 11–13 December – Japan pushes back British forces in Malaya
Battle of Cape Bon 13 December – Italian naval defeat
First Battle of Sirte 17 December – Indecisive engagement between Italian and British naval forces.
Battle of Wake Island 8–23 December – Japanese forces capture the Pacific Island
Battle of Hong Kong 8–25 December – Japanese drive British forces from their Chinese territory
Battle of Changsha 24 December 1941 – 15 January 1942 – Chinese forces battle Japanese back during another Japanese attack on that city and claim victory over Japanese
Battle of the Kerch Peninsula 26 December-19 May - Axis controls Crimea
Battle of Kampar 30 December – 2 January – British forces delay Japanese advance Malaya 
1942
Battle of Slim River 6–8 January
Battle of Tarakan (1942) 11–12 January
Battle of Manado 11–12 January
Battle of Manado 11–13 January – Japanese defeat Dutch force protecting airfields.
Battle of Gemas 14 January Australians ambush Japan forces
Battle of Muar 14–22 January
Battle off Endau 26–27 January – British/Australian naval defeat by japans navy
Battle of Rabaul (1942) Japan defeats Australians, first Australian territory taken by conquest in Australian history
Battle of Port Moresby Air war over Port Moresby
Battle of Makassar Strait 4 February – Japanese defeat Dutch and US naval force
Battle of Bukit Timah 10–12 February – Japanese defeat British Empire forces
Battle of Kranji 9–10 February – Japanese forces capture strait islands
Battle of Palembang 13–15 February – Japan defeat Allied forces
Battle of Drazgose 9 January – First frontal engagement on Slovenian soil with the German occupier
Battle of Moscow 17 January – Soviet defenders drive back German Army Group Centre
Battle of Balikpapan 23 January – Battle in Borneo, Netherlands East Indies. Japanese victory over the Dutch
First Battle of Rabaul 23 January – Japanese victory
North Western Area Campaign – 1942 1945 Air war over northern Australia
Battle of Ambon 30 January – 3 February – Japanese victory in the Dutch East Indies
Battle of Singapore 31 January – 15 February – Japanese forces capture city in Malaya; British army under Arthur Ernest Percival, CB, DSO & Bar, OBE, MC, OStJ, DL, surrenders; largest British surrender of the war.
Battle of Badung Strait 18–19 February – Japanese naval victory despite friendly fire incident
Darwin Air Raids 19 February – Australian hit by Japanese aerial attacks
Battle of the Java Sea 4 February – 1 March – Japanese wipe out Allied naval squadron
Battle of Leuwiliang 3–5 March Australian British American forces are defeated by Japan
Invasion of Buka and Bougainville 9 March – 5 April – Japanese forces invaded and defeat Australian forces capturing bukA and Bougainville
Battle of Timor 19–10 February 1943 - Japanese victory - tactical Australian victory
Battle of Java 28 February – 12 March – A battle of the Pacific theatre of World War II between Japan and the Netherlands. Japanese victory
Battle of Sunda Strait 28 February – 1 March – (ABDACOM) naval force, under Admiral Karel Doorman was defeated by the Japanese fleet
Battle of Toungoo 19–29 March
Battle of Oktwin 20–23 March
Second Battle of Sirte 22 March – An Italian naval force attacks the escort of a British convoy.
Japanese Raids into Indian Ocean 31 March – Japanese raids against the British Eastern Fleet. Heavy British losses
Battle of Bataan 1 January – 9 April – Japanese defeat and imprison US and Philippine force
Battle of Yenangyaung 11–19 April
Battle of Nanos 18 April – 800 Italian soldiers lay siege to 54 Slovene partisans
Doolittle Raid 18 April – U.S. aircraft bomb Tokyo, crash-land in China
Battle of Zhejiang-Jiangxi 18 April – Chinese and Japanese forces search for the surviving Doolittle Raiders
 Destruction of Telavåg 30 April – German forces destroy entire Norwegian town
Battle of the Coral Sea 4 May – U.S. loses ; Japanese win tactically but lose strategically to US/Australian navies. First naval battle in history in which the opposing ships neither sighted nor directly fired on one another; all offensive action was carried out by carrier-based aircraft
Battle of Corregidor 5–6 May – Last US bastion in Asia surrenders to the Japanese after prolonged siege
Battle of the Philippines 8 December 1941 – 8 May – Japanese victory, Douglas MacArthur promises to return
Battle of the St. Lawrence 11 May – U-553 sinks the Nicoya and the Leto in the Gulf of the St. Lawrence river
Second Battle of Kharkov 12–28 May – Soviet counterattack thwarted
Battle of Bir Hakeim 26 May – 11 June – Free French Forces successfully delay Rommel's advance towards Egypt
Battle of Gazala 26 May – 21 June – Erwin Rommel, reinforced by Italians, defeats Great Britain
Operation Anthropoid 27 May - Assassinating Schutzstaffel (SS)-Obergruppenfüher Reinhard Heydrich
Attack on Sydney Harbour 31 May – 8 June – Japanese submarines attack Australian cities.
Battle of Midway 4–7 June – US loses ; Japanese lose four aircraft carriers
 Battle of Pantelleria 15 June – An Italian naval force successfully attacks a British convoy (Operation Harpoon).
 Raid on Salamaua (1942) 28 June - Australian commandos raid Japanese forces 120 Japanese killed 3 Australians wounded
 First Battle of Voronezh 28 June-24 July - Axis capture Voronezh
Convoy PQ 17 – 27 ships leave Iceland on 17 June for Murmansk – on 5 10 July ships reach Murmansk
First Battle of El Alamein 1 July – British Eighth Army stops Rommel's Axis forces invading Egypt
Raid on Heath's Farm 1 July- Australian commandos attack and kill 44 Japanese 
Battle of Sevastopol 2 July – Captured by Germans after eight-month siege
Battle of Stalingrad 17 July 1942 – 2 February 1943 – City besieged by Paulus' German Sixth Army; from 23 November the Sixth Army is surrounded and destroyed by Soviets; bloodiest battle in history, 1.8 millions dead approx.
Invasion of Buna–Gona 21–27 July - Japan defeats Australian forces and capture buna-gona
Battle of Savo Island 9 August – Japanese sink four U.S. cruisers HMAS Canberra is also lost
Battle of Dieppe 19 August – "Operation Jubilee"  was an Allied attack on the German-occupied port of Dieppe in France. Allied Failure, Information used for D-Day
Kokoda Track campaign 21 July - Start of the Kokoda Track Campaign - Australia's finest hour
Battle of Kokoda 8–10 August - Australians capture Kokoda Airfield
Battle of the Eastern Solomons 24 August – Japanese aircraft carrier  sunk
Battle of Milne Bay, Papua New Guinea 25 August – 7 September – Australians defeat Japanese. First clear Allied victory over Japanese land forces
Battle of Isurava 26–31 August - Australian forces are pushed down the Kokoda trail 
Battle of Alam Halfa 30 August – 6 September – Allies vs. Rommel in North Africa
Battle of Mission Ridge – Brigade Hill 6–9 September - Japan defeat Australian forces
Battle of Ioribaiwa 14–16 September- Australians withdraw down the Kokoda trail
First Battle of Eora Creek – Templeton's Crossing Japanese forces defeat Australian forces
Raid on Mubo (1942) 1 October- Australian commandos raid Japanese forces killing 50
Battle of Višegrad 5 October
Battle of Cape Esperance 11 October – near Guadalcanal
Second Battle of Eora Creek – Templeton's Crossing 11–28 October - Australians advance after being halted by Japan
Second Battle of El Alamein 23 October – 4 November – Montgomery's Eighth Army forces Rommel out of Egypt
Battle of the Santa Cruz Islands 25 October – near Guadalcanal,  sunk, but Japanese withdraw victorious
Battle of Goodenough Island 22–27 October- Australians take island from the Japanese
Battle of Oivi–Gorari 4–11 November - Major Australian Victory
Operation Torch 8 November – Allied landings in North Africa
Naval Battle of Guadalcanal 12 November – U.S. defeats Japan, turning point of the Pacific War
Battle of Buna–Gona 16 November- 22 January - Australian & American forces win decisive victory over Japan
Battle of Tassafaronga 30 November – off Guadalcanal
1943
Battle of Osankarica 8 January – About 2000 Germans massacred all 69 men and women of the Pohorje battalion. Germans lost 19 men and had 31 wounded
 Battle of Velikiye Luki 19 November 1942 – 16 January 1943 – Germans clash with Soviets
 Battle of Buna-Gona 16 November 1942 – 22 January 1943 – Americans and Australians defeat Japanese
 Battle of Neretva 20 January – March – Large joint Axis offensive that attempts to destroy Partisan resistance in Yugoslavia, but fails
 Battle of Rennell Island 29–30 January – Japanese bombers sink a cruiser
Battle of Wau 29 January – 4 February – Australian victory
 Battle of Guadalcanal 7 August 1942 – 9 February 1943 – Allies finally take the island after a six-month battle
 Battle of Timor 10 February – After one-year battle, Japanese conquer the island
 Battle of the Kasserine Pass 14–25 February – German victory over British Empire and U.S. forces in Tunisia
 Third Battle of Kharkov 16 February – 15 March – Nazi victory
 Battle of the Bismarck Sea 2 March – Australian and U.S. air forces destroy Japanese convoy
 Battle of Blackett Strait 6 March – Two Japanese destroyers sunk
 Battle of the Komandorski Islands 26 March – U.S. naval victory,  damaged
 Warsaw Ghetto Uprising 18 April – 13,000 Polish Jews killed German forces
Operation Vengeance 18 April - Killing Imperial Japanese Navy Marshal Admiral Isoroku Yamamoto
Battle of Bobdubi 22 April- 19 August - Australian forces defeat Japanese forces
Battle of Mubo 22 April - 14 July Australians force Japan to retreat 
Raid on Darwin (2 May 1943) major Air raid on Darwin
Battle of West Hubei 12 May – 3 June – Chinese forces under Bai Chongxi defeat Japanese
Sutjeska offensive 15 May – 16 June – Failed Axis offensive against Yugoslav Partisans
Battle of New Georgia 20 June – 25 August – U.S. and British Empire victory in the Solomon Islands
Battle of Lababia Ridge 20–23 June - Australians defeat Japanese attack
Landing at Nassau Bay 30 June Australians & Americans defeat Japan
Battle of Kula Gulf 6 July – Indecisive naval battle in the Solomons
Battle of Enogai 10–11 July – US victory
Battle of Kolombangara 12–13 July – American ships damaged while pursuing Japanese
Battle of Mount Tambu 16 July – 18 August – Australian decisive victory
Battle of Bairoko 20 July – Japanese victory
Battle of Roosevelt Ridge Allied victory over Japan
Battle of Munda Point 22 July – 5 August
Battle of Vella Gulf 6–7 August – Japanese lose three destroyers
Battle of the Aleutian Islands 15 August – Japanese invade, but are repelled by American and Canadian forces
Battle of Vella Lavella (land) 15 August – 6 October
Battle off Horaniu 17–18 August – Japanese naval retreat, subsequently evacuation of 9,000 Japanese men
Battle of Kursk 4 July – 23 August – Germans attack Kursk salient at Orel and Belgorod, but are stopped by heavy Russians defenses; arguably the largest tank battle ever fought. Heavy losses
Fourth Battle of Kharkov 23 August – Soviets liberate town
Battle of Arundel Island 27 August – 21 September
Landing at Nadzab 5 September - American - Australian airborne landing defeats Japanese forces
Landing at Lae 4–16 September - Australians & Americans land at Lae
Battle of Castle Turjak 19 September – Slovene partisans take the castle guarded by the Slovene village sentries
Battle of Kaiapit 19–20 September - Australian victory over Japan
Battle of Finschhafen 22 September – 24 October
Battle of Dumpu 22 September - 4 October Australian forces defeat Japan
Battle of Leros 26 September – 16 November – Germans attack and force surrender of British garrison on Leros; British force under general Robert Adolphus George Tilney, CBE DSO TD, forced to surrender.
Naval Battle of Vella Lavella 6 October – Japanese win, both sides lose one destroyer
Battle of John's Knoll–Trevor's Ridge 12–13 October – Australian victory over Japan
Battle of Lenino 12–13 October
Raid on Schweinfurt 14 October – Air battle between the Luftwaffe and the U.S. Air Force; "Black Thursday"
Battle of the Treasury Islands 25 October – 12 November – New Zealand defeats Japan in the Solomon Islands
Battle of Empress Augusta Bay 1–2 November – Japan suffers a naval defeat
Rabaul 1–11 November – Allies launch successful raids
Battle of Changde 2 November – 20 December – Chinese victory, Japanese use biological and chemical weapons
Bombing of Rabaul (November 1943) 2–11 November - Allied air attacks on Rabaul
Battle of Koromokina Lagoon 7–8 November
Battle for Piva Trail 8–9 November
Battle of Sattelberg 17–25 November - major Australian victory
Battle of Tarawa 20–22 November – First contested amphibious landing of World War II
Battle of Makin 20–24 November – American forces defeat the Japanese in the Gilbert Islands
Battle of Cape St. George 27 November – Japanese convoy suffers heavy damage
Battle of the Treasury Islands 27 October – 12 November – Major New Zealand victory
Battle of Wareo 27 November – 8 December
Landings at Cape Torokina - 1–3 November – American/New Zealand forces defeat Japanese forces
Battle for Monte la Difensa 3–9 December
Battle of Sio 5 December - major Australian victory over Japan
Battle of Arawe 15 December - 24 February 1944 Allied victory against Japan  
Battle of Ortona 20–28 December
Battle of North Cape 26 December – British naval victory over Germany
Battle of The Pimple 27–28 December - Australian victory
1944
Battle of Monte Cassino 17 January – 19 May – Four battles, Allies finally victorious, breaking through to advance on Rome
Battle of Shaggy Ridge 19–31 January – Australian victory
Battle of Rapido River 20–22 January
Battle of Korsun Pocket 24 January – 16 February – Decisive Soviet victory
Battle of the Green Islands 15–20 February- New Zealand forces supported by Americans defeat Japan
Battle of Cisterna 30 January – 2 February – Part of Operation Shingle – 1st, 3rd, and 4th U.S. Army Ranger battalions attempted to capture the town of Cisterna
Battle of Kwajalein 31 January – 3 February – American victory in the Marshall Islands, several Korean laborers captured
Battle of Madang Australian victory over Japan in the pacific 
Attack on Truk 17–18 February – Successful American air raid in the Marshall Islands
Battle of Eniwetok 17–23 February – American victory allows U.S. forces to set up for an attack on the Mariana Islands
Battle of Hube's Pocket 25 March – 15 April – Germans victorious, but have to retreat afterward
Raid on Drvar April – May – Failed German military operation that aimed to capture Josip Broz Tito, leader of the Yugoslav partisans
Battle of Central Henan April – December – Marginal Japanese victory in China
Battle of Mubo 22 April – 14 July
Battle of Bobdui 22 April – 19 August
Battle of Lone Tree Hill 17 May – 2 September – American victory in the Pacific theatre
Battle of Wakde 18–21 May – American and Australian victory over the Japanese
Battle of Biak 27 May – 17 August
Battle of Normandy 6 June – 25 August – Allies invade northern France across the Normandy beaches (Operation Overlord); hard fighting from Cherbourg to Caen; Germans surrounded and destroyed at Falaise
Battle of Villers-Bocage 13 June – Germans defeat allies near Normandy during Operation Overlord
Battle of Porytowe Wzgórze 14–15 June
Battle of Noemfoor 2 July - 31 August – American victory supported by the Royal Australian Air Force
Battle of Saipan 15 June – 9 July – American forces capture island
Battle of Philippine Sea 19 June – Major carrier battle; U.S. lose 123 planes and destroy 315 Japanese planes
Battle of Lababia Ridge 20–23 June
Operation Bagration 22 June – Eastern Front.  Soviet offensive destroys German Army Group Center
Operation Martlet 25 June
Battle of Tali-Ihantala 25 June – 9 July – Finnish stop Soviet offensive
Battle of Noemfoor 2 July – 31 August
Battle of Vuosalmi 4–11 July – Finnish victory over the Soviets during the Continuation War
Battle of Driniumor River 10 July – 25 August 
Battle of Mount Tambu 16 July – 18 August
Battle of Auvere 20–25 July
Battle of Guam 21 July – 10 August – 18,000 Japanese killed during American attack
Battle of Roosevelt Ridge 21 July – 14 August
Battle of Tinian 24 July – 1 August – Japanese, realizing they will lose, launch a suicidal charge against Americans
Battle of Sansapor 30 July – 31 August
Warsaw Uprising 1 August – 3 October – 20,000 armed Poles against 55,000 Wehrmacht and SS, city destroyed in 90%, more than 250,000 casualties
Fourth Battle of Changsha August – Japanese capture nearby town, but unable to continue fighting afterward
Operation Dragoon (aka Operation Anvil) 15 August – Allied invasion of Southern France
Liberation of Paris 15–25 August – Allied forces drive Nazi German forces out of the French capital
Battle of Guilin-Liuzhou 16 August – 24 November – Japanese victory in China
Operation Tanne Ost 15 September – Germans unable to capture island
Battle of Peleliu 15 September – A fight to capture an airstrip on a speck of coral in the western Pacific
Battle of Arnhem 17–26 September – The major battle of Operation Market Garden; Allies reach but fail to cross the Rhine; British First Airborne Division destroyed
Battle of Anguar 17–30 September – Volcanic island captured by Americans
Hürtgen Forest 19 September – 10 February 1945 – German Army repels US forces with high losses for both.
Battle of Porkuni 21 September
Battle of Leros 26 September – 16 November
Battle of Olhava 28 September
Battle of Tornio 1–8 October – Finns capture Tornio from the Germans, start of the Lapland War proper
Battle of the Scheldt 2 October – 8 November – Difficult Canadian victory secures the port of Antwerp, and ensures critical supplies for advancing allied forces
Battle of Crucifix Hill – The U.S. 1st Infantry Division attacks and takes Crucifix Hill, a strategic point which allows the Battle of Aachen to occur. Cpt. Bobbie E. Brown wins a Medal of Honor for his heroics
Battle of Aachen 2–21 October – Aachen was the first major German city to face invasion during World War II
Battle of Kos 3–4 October
Battle of Debrecen 6–29 October – Germans able to hold back Soviets
Battle of Vukov Klanac 15–23 October
Battle of Morotai 15 October - Allied victory over Japan
Battle of Leyte 20 October – 31 December – Combined American and Philippine Commonwealth military forces including recognized guerrillas begin the liberation of the Philippines
Battle of Leyte Gulf 23–26 October – The largest air-sea battle in history- American/Australian fleet destroy Japan's fleet
Landing at Jacquinot Bay 4 November – Australians land at Jacquinot Bay
Operation Queen 16 November
Battle of Ormoc Bay 11 November – 21 December – Americans prevent Japanese from resupplying Leyte
Battle of Monte Castello 25 November 1945 – 12 February 1946 – Brazilian troops fight Germans in Italy
Aitape–Wewak campaign November 1944 – 1945 Australian victory over Japan
Battle of Mindoro 13–16 December – Combined U.S., Australian and Philippine Commonwealth Military Forces including recognized guerrillas capture main island off Luzon, Philippines
Battle of Wide Bay–Open Bay - Australians defeat Japanese
Battle of the Bulge 16 December – 25 January 1945 – German counterattack in Ardennes; General McAuliffe says "NUTS" at Bastogne
Battle of Pearl Ridge 30–31 December
1945
Battle of Luzon 9 January – 15 August – Filipino and American victory. U.S. Sixth and Eighth Army including the Filipino soldiers of the Philippine Commonwealth Army and Philippine Constabulary including recognized guerrillas retakes and completes the recapture of Northern Philippines
Battle of Tsimba Ridge 17 January – 9 February
Black Friday (1945) 9 February – British Empire air operation ends in defeat
Battle of Tsimba Ridge – Australian victory over the Japanese
Operation Elephant 26 January – Allied offensive against a German bridgehead at Kapelsche Veer in the Netherlands
Raid at Cabanatuan 30 January – U.S. Army Rangers and Filipino guerrillas rescue Bataan and Corregidor prisoners of war from Japanese prison camp
Battle for the Recapture of Bataan 31 January – 8 February – Combined US and Philippine Commonwealth military forces including recognized guerrillas retake the historic Bataan Peninsula
Battle for the Liberation of Manila 3 February – 3 March – City totally devastated after month-long battle between the combined US and Philippine Commonwealth military forces including recognized guerrillas against the Japanese Imperial forces. 100,000 civilians killed
Battle for the Recapture of Corregidor 16–26 February – Spectacular combined U.S. and Philippine Commonwealth assault retakes island bastion from Japanese forces
Raid at Los Baños 23 February – U.S. Airborne Task Force and Filipino guerrillas rescues more than 2,000 Allied POWs and civilian internees held by Japanese
Battle of the Transdanubian Hills 6–21 August
Battle of Mindanao 10 March – 15 August – U.S. Eighth Army including the Filipino soldiers of the Philippine Commonwealth Army and Philippine Constabulary and recognized guerrillas completes the recapture of Southern Philippines
Operation Varsity 17 March – 134 Allied gliders land troops in Weisel
Battle of the Visayas 18 March – 30 July – U.S. Eighth Army including the Filipino soldiers of the Philippine Commonwealth Army and Philippine Constabulary and recognized guerrillas retakes central Philippine islands
Battle of West Henan and North Hubei 21 March – 11 May – Indecisive battle between China and Japan. Japan controls airbases after battle
Battle of Iwo Jima 26 March – After a month, U.S. forces take main offshore Japanese island
Battle of Slater's Knoll 28 March – 6 April Decisive Australian victory 
Battle on Lijevča field 30 March – 8 April – Total Ustashian victory over Chetniks
Battle of Bologna 9–21 April
Battle of the Argenta Gap 12–19 April
Battle of the Hongorai River 17 April – 22 May
Battle of Halbe 24 April – 1 May – Part of Battle of Berlin, Germans unable to break out
Battle of Baguio 26 April – Filipino troops of the 66th Infantry Regiment, Philippine Commonwealth Army, USAFIP-NL and the American troops of the 33rd and 37th Infantry Division, United States Army retakes and complete in Baguio City, Northern Philippines
Battle of Berlin 26 April – 2 May – Soviet forces encircle and capture German capital; Hitler commits suicide
Battle of Tanlwe Chaung 26 April
Battle of Triest 30 April – 2 May – British army and Yugoslav capture the city
Battle of Tarakan 1 May – Australian attack supported by America as part of the Borneo campaign
Battle of Zelengora 10–13 May
Battle of Ratsua - Australian victory
Battle of Porton Plantation 8–10 June
Battle of Bessang Pass 14 June – Filipino troops of the 15th, 66th and 121st Infantry Regiment, Philippine Commonwealth Army, USAFIP-NL completes and retakes on the province of Ilocos Sur in Northern Luzon, Philippines
Battle of Poljana – Last battle of World War II in Europe
Battle of West Hunan April–June – Chinese victory in final battle to expel Japan
Battle of Labuan - 10–21 June - Australian attack Japanese in Borneo
Battle of Okinawa 21 June – U.S. and British Empire forces defeat Japanese, U.S. occupies island
Battle of North Borneo 17 June – 15 August – Australian victory in north Borneo
Battle of Beaufort (1945) 26–28 June Australian Victory over Japanese Forces
Soviet invasion of Manchuria 9–20 August – decisive Russian victory over Japan
Battle of Balikpapan 1–21 July – Australian victory over Japan
Battle of Sagami Bay 22–23 July
Battle of Mayoyao Ridge 26 July – 9 August – Filipino troops of the 11th and 14th Infantry Regiment, Philippine Commonwealth Army, USAFIP-NL, take the Japanese stronghold of Mayoyao, Mountain Province (now Ifugao) with U.S. air support.
Opening Campaign 10 August – 10 January 1946 – Chinese Civil War resumes
Battle of Mutanchiang 12–16 August
Battle of Baoying 15–23 August
Battle of Yongjiazhen 16–19 August
Battle of Tianmen 17 August
Battle of Shumshu 18–23 August
Battle of Wuhe 24 August
Battle of Yinji 26–27 August
Battle of Dazhongji 1–13 September
Battle of Lingbi 4–5 September
Battle of Xiangshuikou 18 September
Battle of Rugao 21 September
Battle of Houmajia 18 October
Battle of Surabaya 27 October – 20 November – Indonesian soldiers and militia against British and Dutch troops as a part of the Indonesian National Revolution
Battle of Shaobo 19–21 December

1946–1975
 1946
Battle of Siping 15–17 March – Communist victory
Battle of Huaiyin–Huai'an 21 August – 22 September – Nationalist victory
Battle of Dazhongji 1–13 September – Communist victory
Battle of Lishi 6–9 September – Communist victory
Battle of Kalgan 10–20 October – Nationalist victory
 1947
Battle of Yan'an 19 March
Battle of Niangziguan 24–25 April
Battle of Tang'erli 27–28 April
Operatie Product 21 July – First of two major Dutch military offensives against the Republic of Indonesia during the Indonesian National Revolution
Indo-Pakistani War of 1947 22 October – 5 January 1949 – First war fought between the successor of British India the Dominion of India and newly formed of Pakistan. The war ended with India having majority portion of Kashmir.
Battle of Phoenix Peak 7–9 December
 1948
 1948 Arab–Israeli War – War between Israel and Lebanon, Syria, Transjordan, Egypt and Iraq; many Jewish and Arab refugees.
 Liaoshen Campaign 12 September – 12 November – Decisive Chinese Communist victory over the Chinese Nationalists.
 Huaihai Campaign 6 November 1948 – 10 January 1949 – Decisive Chinese Communist victory over the Chinese Nationalists.
 Pingjin Campaign 29 November 1948 – 31 January 1949 – Decisive Chinese Communist victory over the Chinese Nationalists.
 Operatie Kraai – Part of the "Politionele acties". Although the Dutch were victorious they were forced to give up Indonesia, because of international anti-colonial pressure
 1949
Battle of Kuningtou 25–27 October – Nationalist victory establishes Taiwan as the Nationalist refuge.  Communists left in control of mainland China.
 Battle of Dengbu Island 3–5 November
 1950
Battle of Bamianshan 19–31 January
Battle of Tianquan 14–20 February
Battle of Nan'ao Island 3 March
Battle of Dongshan Island 11 May
Operation Pokpoong 25 June – 31 July – DPRK victory: North Korean offensive
Battle of Chuncheon 25–29 June
First Battle of Seoul 25–28 June
Battle of Gorangpo 25–26 June
Battle of Kaesong-Munsan 25–26 June
Battle of Ongjin 25–26 June
Battle of Uijeongbu 25–26 June
Battle of Suwon Airfield 27 June
Air Battle of South Korea 25 June – 20 July
Battle of Chumonchin Chan 2 July
Battle of Andong late July
Battle of Osan 5 July
Battle of Pyongtaek 6 July
Battle of Chonan 7–8 July
Battle of Chochiwon 10–12 July
Battle of Taejon 14–21 July
Battle of Sangju 20–31 July
Battle of Yongdong 22–25 July
Battle of Hwanggan 23–29 July
Hadong Ambush 27 July
Battle of the Notch 2 August
Battle of Pusan Perimeter 4 August – 18 September – UN forces stop North Korean invasion of South Korea, counterattack in mid-September in conjunction with Battle of Inchon
Battle of Inchon 15–19 September – UN retakes South Korea, reaches Seoul in 12 days
Battle of Sariwon 17 October - UN victory
Battle of Chamdo 6–19 October – Chinese victory, annexation of Tibet by the People's Republic of China
Battle of Onjong 25–29 October – Chinese victory.
Battle of Unsan 25 October – 4 November – Chinese victory
Battle of Pakchon 5 November - Australian/UN victory
Battle of the Ch'ongch'on River 25 November – 2 December – Decisive Chinese victory, UN forces expelled from North Korea.
Battle of Kujin 25–26 October – UN victory
Battle of Chosin Reservoir 27 November – 13 December – Chinese strategic victory.
Battle of Chongju (1950) 29–30 October - Australian/UN victory over china
Third Battle of Seoul 31 December 1950 – 7 January 1951 – Chinese and North Korean forces take Seoul.
 1951
Battle of Uijeongbu (1951) - 1–4 January UN defeat
Battle of Vĩnh Yên 13–17 January – French victory
Battle of Chuam-ni 14–17 November - UN victory over china
Battle of the Twin Tunnels 1 February – UN victory
Battle of Hoengsong 11–13 February Chinese and North Korean victory
Third Battle of Wonju 13–18 February – UN victory
Battle of Maehwa-san 7–12 March – UN victory
Battle of Mạo Khê 23–28 March – French victory
Battle of Yultong 22–23 April – Filipino victory (UN)
Battle of the Imjin River 22–25 April – Chinese victory
Battle of Kapyong 22–25 April – Australian/UN victory
Battle of Bloody Ridge 18 August – 5 September – UN victory
Naval Battle of the Han River (1951) - 28–30 September - Australian navy ship bombs Chinese forces
Battle of Heartbreak Ridge 13 September – 15 October – UN victory
First Battle of Maryang San 3–8 October 1951 – UN victory
Battle of Yongyu 21–22 October - American and Australians defeat North Korean forces
Battle of Nghĩa Lộ 3–10 October – French victory
Battle of Haktang-ni 9–13 October – UN victory
Second Battle of Maryang San 5 November 1951 – Chinese victory
Battle of Sunchon (air) 1 December - Soviet air force defeats Australian air force 
 1952
Battle of Hill Eerie 21 March – 18 July – UN victory
Battle of Bunker Hill (1952) 9 August – 30 September – UN victory
Battle of Outpost Kelly 17–24 September – Chinese victory
Battle of Nanpeng Archipelago 20 September – 20 October
Battle of White Horse 6–15 October – UN victory
Battle of Nanri Island 11–15 October
Battle of Triangle Hill 14 October – 25 November – Chinese victory
Second Battle of the Hook 18–19 November - United Nations victory
Battle of Nà Sản 23 November – 2 December – French victory
Battle of the Noris 11–14 December – UN victory
 1953
Battle of Pork Chop Hill 23 March – 11 July – UN victory in April, Chinese victory in July
Battle of the Nevada Complex 25–29 May – Chinese victory
Third Battle of the Hook 28–29 May – UN victory
Battle of Dalushan Islands 29 May
Battle of Kumsong 10 June – 20 July – Chinese victory
Battle of the Berlin Outposts and Boulder City 7–27 July – UN victory
Battle of the Samichon River 24–26 July – UN victory
 1954 Battle of Dien Bien Phu – France loses Indochina when besieged here, from 1953 (First Indochina War)
1955
Battle of Yijiangshan Islands 18–20 January
Battle of Philippeville 20 August
Battle of Famagusta 20–21 November
Battle of the Pine 23 November
Battle of Spilia 12 December
 1956 Suez Crisis – Britain, France, Israel attempt to retake Suez Canal after recent Egyptian nationalization.  Large engagements included the Battle of Mitla Pass and the Battle of Port Said
 1957
Battle of Agounennda 23–25 May
Battle of Bouzegza 4–12 August
1958
Battle of Bab El Bekkouche 28–31 May
Battle of La Plata 11–21 July
Battle of Las Mercedes 29 July – 8 August
Battle of Yaguajay 19–30 December
1961 Bay of Pigs Invasion – A failed U.S.-backed attempt to capture Cuba and a major blow to US pride and reputation
 1962
 Battle of Arafura Sea 15 January – Western New Guinea dispute/Operation Trikora; this was the last time the Royal Netherlands Navy sunk a ship
 Sino-Indian War 20 October – 21 November – Chinese victory
 Battle of Namka Chun – Chinese victory
 1963
Battle of Go Cong 3 September
Battle of Hiệp Hòa 22 November
 1964
 Landing at Kesang River - 29 October Australian and British forces defeat Indonesian landing
 Action of 13 December 1964 - Australian minesweeper defeats Indonesian patrol boat
 Battle of Nam Dong - Allied victory over North Vietnam

1965
Second Kashmir War – Also known as the Indo-Pakistani War of 1965, was the second battle fought between the Republic of India and the Islamic Republic of Pakistan over Kashmir. The war resulted in Indian victory and United Nations-mandated ceasefire between the two countries.
Battle of Asal Uttar – Indian victory
Battle of Lahore – Indian victory
Battle of Chawinda – Inconclusive
Battle of Phillora – Indian victory
Battle of Sungei Koemba - 27 may - 12 June Australian forces defeat Indonesian forces 
Battle of Kindau - 15 June - Australian forces defeat Indonesian forces
Battle of Babang - 12 July - Australian forces defeat Indonesian forces
Battle of Ia Drang 14–18 November – First major encounter between the United States Army and the People's Army of Vietnam in Vietnam. Over the first two days an American battalion repulses continuous Vietnamese assaults; another battalion, sent to reinforce the first, is ambushed on the fourth day when it withdraws, suffering heavy losses.
Operation Hump - American/ Australian success
 1966 
Battle of Nakhang 16–28 February
Battle of Suoi Bong Trang - Major Australian victory
Operation Marauder - allied victory
Battle of Đức Cơ 23–24 February
Operation Crimp 8-14 American/Australian operation 
Battle of A Sau 9–10 March
Battle of Xa Cam My 11–12 April
Battle of Sinoia 28 April
Battle of Hill 488 15–16 June
Battle of Minh Thanh Road 9 July
Battle of Nam Bac August – January 1968
Battle of Đức Cơ 9–10 August
Battle of Long Tan 18–19 August – First major action of Australian forces in Vietnam
 1967
 Nathu La and Cho La clashes – Indian forces beat back Chinese forces
Operation Bribie - indecisive action
 Six-Day War
 Battle of Abu-Ageila (1967)
 Battle of Ammunition Hill
 Battle of Nsukka
 Midwest Invasion of 1967
Battle of Suoi Chau Pha - Australian victory
 Battle of Ore
 Fall of Enugu
 First Battle of Onitsha
 Operation Tiger Claw
Operation Santa Fe

 1968
  23 January – North Korea seizes U.S. ship
Operation Coburg 24 January - 1 March - Australian victory over North Vietnam
 Tet Offensive 30 January – North Vietnam loses militarily but turns the tide of US opinion against the war
 Battle of Khe Sanh 21 January – 8 April – Desperate defense by the US Marines to hold strategically important fire base against huge NVA numbers. Vietnamese Communists fail in their bid to turn the siege into an "American Battle of Dien Bien Phu." Though it's also possible that Khe Sanh was used as a diversion.
 Battle of Coral–Balmoral 12 May – 6 June 1968 – Australian forces repel multiple North Vietnamese and Viet Cong attacks over 26 days of fighting
Battle of Kham Duc 10-12 may - North Vietnamese forces victory
Battle of Hat Dich - 3 December -19 February 1969
 Second Battle of Onitsha
 Battle of Karameh
 Abagana Ambush
 Capture of Port Harcourt
 Operation OAU
 Capture of Owerri
 1969
Defense of Umuahia 27 March – 22 April
Battle of Hamburger Hill 10–20 May
Battle of Binh Ba 6–8 June Australians defeat Viet Cong
Operation Camden (1969) - Australian success
Football War 14 July – Between El Salvador and Honduras
Battle of the Bogside 12 August – Unarmed Irish residents of the Bogside in Derry City expel British Police and Militia Forces from their area. The riots lasts for 2 days until the British Army is sent in. This event is often described as the beginning of the Troubles, a 30-year guerrilla war.
Defense of Oguta 20–24 December
 1970
Battle of St Matthew's 27–28 June - A battle between Provisional IRA and loyalists during The Troubles
Operation Tail-Wind
Operation Green Sea 22 November - An amphibious attack on Conakry, Guinea by Portugal during the Guinea-Bissau War of Independence
 1971
 Indo-Pakistani War of 1971 /Bangladesh Liberation War – India militarily supports East Pakistan (now Bangladesh ) in its struggle for independence from West Pakistan (now Pakistan). Backed by the India, the Armed Forces of India defeat Pakistan and liberate Bangladesh.
 Battle of Longewala 5 December – Decisive Indian victory
 Battle of Hilli – Tactical Indian victory
Battle of Long Khánh - Australian costly victory
 Battle of Garibpur – Decisive Indian victory
 Battle of Basantar – Tactical Indian victory
Battle of Nui Le - Last major Australian/NZ victory of Vietnam war
 Operation Trident 4 Dec -ember – Indian Navy attacks Karachi port
 1972 
First Battle of Quảng Trị 30 March – 1 May
Second Battle of Lộc Ninh 4–7 April
Battle of An Lộc 13 April – 20 July
Battle of Đồng Hới 19 April
Battle at Springmartin 13-14 may - A battle that involved the British Army, the Provisional Irish Republican Army (IRA), and the Ulster Volunteer Force (UVF)
Battle of Mirbat 19 July – British SAS forces defeat Communist rebels during an attempted coup of Oman.
Second Battle of Quảng Trị 28 June – 16 September
 1973
 Operation Badr 6-8 October - Egyptian offensive marking the beginning of the Yom Kippur War.
 Battles of Fort Budapest 6 October - Egyptian troops fail to capture an Israeli fort.
 Battle of Fort Lahtzanit 6 October - Egyptians capture an Israeli fort.
 Ofira Air Battle 6 October - Israeli victory in the air
 First Battle of Mount Hermon 6-7 October - Syria recaptures Mount Hermon
 Valley of Tears 6-9 October - Very bloody battle in the Golan Heights
 Operation Model 5 7 October - Syrian troops win an anti-aircraft battle
 Operation Tagar 7 October - Israel forfeits the operation attempting to block Egyptian troops
 Battle of Marsa Talamat 7 October - Israel defeats Egyptian ships
 Battle of Latakia 7 October - Israel defeats Syrian troops off the coast of Latakia.
 Romani ambush 7 October - Successful Israeli ambush
 Second Battle of Mount Hermon 8 October - Syrian victory
 Battle of Baltim 8-9 October - Israel defeats Egyptian ships off the Egyptian coast
 Syrian General Staff Headquarters raid 9 October - Israel successfully raids the general staff of Syria
 Second Battle of Latakia 11 October - Inconclusive 
 Operation Gown 12 October - Israel destroys Syrian supply lines
 Raid on al-Mazzah Airport 13 October - Israeli victory
 Air battle of Mansoura 14 October - Egyptian planes defeat an Israeli plane.
 Battle of the Sinai 14 October- Israeli victory
 Battle of The Chinese Farm 15-17 October - Israeli victory
 Operation Abirey-Halev 15-23 October - Successful Israeli victory near Suez
 Egyptian 25th Brigade ambush 17 October - Israeli victory
 Battle of Ismailia 18-22 October - Israel fails to block Egyptian supply lines.
 Third Battle of Mount Hermon 21-22 October - Israel captures the mountain after a third assault
 Battle of Suez 24-25 October - Egypt holds the Suez Canal
 1974
Battle of the Paracel Islands 19–20 January – Chinese victory
Battle of Tri Phap 12 February – 4 May
Battle of Kampot 26 February – 2 April
Battle of Svay Rieng 27 March – 2 May
Battle of the Iron Triangle 16 May – 20 November
Turkish invasion of Cyprus 20 July – 16 August
Battle of Thượng Ðức 29 July – 11 November
 1975
 Battle of Xuân Lộc 9–12 April – Remnants of ARVN make a last stand in the final major battle of the Vietnam War
 Battle of the Hotels 23 October-2 April - Muslims and Christians end up divided in Western Beirut.
 Indonesia invades East Timor 7 December
 Battles of La Güera and Tichla 10–22 December - Mauritania occupies La Güera and Tichla

1976–2000
 1976
First Battle of Amgala 27–29 January - Algerian withdrawal
Second Battle of Amgala 14–15 February - Sahrawi victory
Flagstaff Hill incident 5–6 May - Irish Army pushes back British special forces
Operation Entebbe 4 July
Garryhinch ambush 16 October - IRA bombs Brits
Battle of Hill 31 15 November
 1977
 A battle of the Ogaden War – The Ethiopian army inflicts heavy losses on the Somali National Army (SNA) after a Somali attack by 1 tank battalion and a mechanized infantry brigade supported by artillery units
 First Battle of Jijiga A battle of the Ogaden War – The Somalis, trying to take the town, lose more than half of their attacking force of 3 tank battalions, each of which includes more than 30 tanks
 Second Battle of Jijiga  – A battle of the Ogaden War.  Three Somali tank battalions overwhelm an Ethiopian garrison. After inflicting some heavy losses on Somali armor, Ethiopian troops mutiny and withdraw from the town, leaving its defense to the militia, which is incapable of slowing the Somali advance.
 Battle of Harar – A major battle of the Ogaden War
 1978
British Army Gazelle downing 17 February
Battle of Cassinga 4 May
Battle of Kaukaba 9 May
Battle of Kolwezi 18–22 May
 1979
Battle of N'Djamena 12 – 15 February 
Battle of Lạng Sơn 17 February – 16 March
Battle of Dong Dang 17–23 February
Battle of Lao Cai 17 February – 5 March
Battle of Masaka 23–24 February
Battle of Tororo 2–4 March
Battle of Lukaya 10–11 March
Battle of Entebbe 7 April
Battle of Jinja 22 April
Battle of Lira 15 May
Battle of Karuma Falls 17 May
Battle of Bondo 27 May
Warrenpoint ambush 27 August
First Battle of Al Mahbes 14 October - Sahrawi victory
1980
Battle of N'Djamena 22 March – 15 December 
Iran–Iraq War
Siege of Abadan November 1980 – September 1981 – Iraq attacks the Iranian city of Abadan but fails to capture it
Liberation of Khorramshahr November 1980 – 24 May 1982 – The Iranians recapture of the port city of Khorramshahr from the Iraqis
 1981
 Battle of Dezful Early January 1981 – Iranian armored regiments are forced to flee after an Iraqi ambush
 Gulf of Sidra incident 19 August – Two Sukhoi Su-22 were shot down by two U.S. F-14A Tomcats
 First Battle of Guelta Zemmur 13–29 October - Sahrawi victory
 1982
1982 Lebanon War 6 June – Israeli invasion of Lebanon
 Falklands War:
Battle of San Carlos (1982) 21–25 May
Battle of Seal Cove 23 May
Battle of Goose Green 28–29 May
Battle of Mount Harriet 11 June
Battle of Two Sisters 11 June
Battle of Mount Longdon 11 June
Battle of Wireless Ridge 13 June
Battle of Mount Tumbledown 13 June
 1983
 Invasion of Grenada 25 October –by U.S. forces
 1984
 Operation Meghdoot 13 April – Battle between India and Pakistan in which India captured entire Siachen Glacier.
 Operation Blue Star 6 June
 Battle of the Marshes 1984 – Iran opens a new offensive in the lakes of the Hawizah Marshes in Iraq.
 1985
 Second Battle of Al Mahbes 12 January - Sahrawi forces break through a wall put up by Morocco
 1986
 First Battle of Al Faw 11 February – Iranians launch a surprise attack against the Iraqi troops defending the al-Faw Peninsula.
 Action in the Gulf of Sidra March – U.S. naval operations against Libya
 1987
 Battle of Fada 2 January
Battle of B'ir Kora 18–20 March
Battle of Aouzou 8–28 August
Battle of Cuito Cuanavale South African Border War – South African victory against Angola
Battle of Maaten al-Saara 5 September
Battles of Farsia and Oum Dreyga 18 November - Inconclusive
 1988
Battle of Afabet 17–20 March - A decisive EPLF victory over Ethiopia in the Eritrean War of Independence
Second Battle of Al Faw 17 April – Newly restructured Iraqi Army conducts a major operation to clear the Iranians out of the peninsula
Operation Praying Mantis 18 April – One day U.S.-Iranian naval action
Operation Mersad – Iran destroys the Khalq-e-Mujahedin
 1989
 Gulf of Sidra incident 4 January – Two Libyan MiG-23 Flogger Es were shot down by United States F-14A Tomcats.
 Second Battle of Guelta Zemmur 7 October - Moroccan victory
 Battle of Hausa 11 October - Moroccan victory
 Third Battle of Amgala 8 November - Last military operation of the Western Sahara War until the 90's.
 Operation Just Cause 20 December – the United States invasion of Panama
 1990
Gulf War
Battle of the Bridges – Iraqi victory
 1991
 Gulf War
 Battle of Khafji 29 January – 1 February, first major ground engagement of the Gulf War
 Liberation of Kuwait 24–28 February 
 Battle of 73 Easting 26–27 February – A decisive tank battle fought between coalition armoured forces against those of the Iraqi Republican Guard
 Battle of Medina Ridge 27 February – A decisive tank battle fought between the U.S. 1st Armored Division and the 2nd Brigade of the Iraqi Republican Guard.
 Battle of Vukovar 25 August − 18 November – Croatian War of Independence
 Battle of the Barracks September – Croatian War of Independence
 1992
Siege of Sarajevo 5 April 1992 – 29 February 1996
Battle of Tighina 19–21 June
Battle of the Miljevci Plateau 21–23 June
Operation Corridor 14 June 1992 – July 1992 – Army of the Republika Srpska defeated joint forces of the Croatian Defence Council and the Army of the Republic of Bosnia and Herzegovina (ARBiH) and created the Brčko corridor which connected two eastern and western part of Republic of Srpska while Croatian and Bosniak (Muslim) forces suffered large casualties.
Battle of Gagra 1 October 1992 – 6 October 1992 – Abkhaz insurgents and North Caucasian militants captured Gagra from Georgian forces (War in Abkhazia).
 1993
Operation Maslenica 22 January – 1 February – Croatian War of Independence
 Battle of Kelbajar 27 March – 3 April – Armenians and Azeris fight for territorial disputes
Battle of Žepče 24–30 June – Croat–Bosniak War
Battle of Bugojno 18–29 July – Croat–Bosniak War
Battle of Newry Road 23 September - Gun battle between British Army helicopters and Provisional Irish Republican Army (IRA) armed trucks
Battle of Mogadishu 3–4 October – Policing mission gone wrong, US soldiers trapped against militia in a populated city
Battle of Pooneryn 11–14 November
 1994
 Zapatista uprising 1–12 January - Battles between Mexican Army and zapatista rebels
 Afghanistan's Islamic State of Afghanistan (United Front) ousted by Islamic Emirate of Afghanistan (Taliban)
 Fall of Manerplaw 11 December 1994 – 27 January 1995 – Myanmar Army and DKBA soldiers captured and occupied the headquarters of the Karen National Union
 Battle of Kawmoora 19 December 1994 – 21 February 1995 – The Myanmar Army captured the final stronghold of the Karen National Union
 1995
First battle of Grozny 31 December 1994 – 8 February 1995 – Russian Army captures Grozny
 Operation Flash 1–2 May – Croatian War of Independence
Battle of Orašje 5 May – 10 June – Bosnian War
Battle of Vrbanja Bridge 27 May – Bosnian War
Operation Storm 4–8 August – Croatian War of Independence
 1996
Battle of Grozny - Chechen rebels recapture the city
 1998
Battle of Belaćevac Mine 23–30 June – A coal mine critical to the electricity supply of Kosovo is temporarily captured by the Kosovo Liberation Army from the Yugoslav Army.
 Battle of Glodjane 10 August – 9 September – Glodjane retaken by the Yugoslav army from the Kosovo Liberation Army
Battle for Kinshasa 26–30 August - Rwanda fails to take Kinshasa from the Democratic Republic of the Congo and Zimbabwe in the Second Congo War
1998 Battle of Kilinochchi 27–29 September – Liberation Tigers of Tamil Eelam captures Kilinochchi from Sri Lanka Army
Battle of Yeosu 17–18 December – North Korean semi-submersible vessel intercepted and sunk by Republic of Korea Navy
Battle of Podujevo 23–27 December
 1999
Kargil War – Pakistani paramilitary forces infiltrate into India's Kargil district triggering full-scale war between the two neighbours. After two months of intense fighting, ceasefire and return to status quo ante bellum. The battle ended with decisive Indian victory.
 Battle of Tololing Indian victory
 Battle of Grozny (1999-2000) – The Russian Army sieges Grozny in December, captures it in February 2000
 Battle of Košare 9 April 1999 – 10 June 1999 – Kosovo war
Battle of Aidabasalala 16 October - Australian special forces victory
 2000
Battle of Komsomolskoye 6–24 March – Russian Army destroys a remnant Chechen group that escaped Grozny
Lungi Lol confrontation 17 May – United Kingdom repulses an RUF attack during the British military intervention in the Sierra Leone Civil War
Battle of Camp Abubakar July 9

References

1900